Joseph Pitts (1663–1735?) was an Englishman who was taken into slavery by Barbary pirates in Algiers, Algeria in 1678 at the age of fourteen or fifteen. During his time in captivity, Pitts went through three masters over the course of more than fifteen years, with whom he travelled to Cairo and Alexandria. Though he escaped between the years 1693 and 1694, it was not until 1704 that Pitts first published his account. Pitts's A True and Faithful Account of the Religion and Manners of the Mohammetans, includes descriptions of his capture and captivity, including some of the first English descriptions of Islamic rituals. Converting to Islam while a slave, Pitts was the first Englishman to record the proceedings of the hajj. Pitts also describes the people of seventeenth-century North Africa in detail, providing particulars on their manner of eating and dressing, the customs of their religion and marriage, and their economic and slave systems. Pitts's narrative was the first and most detailed description of Islam and the manners of Muslims written by a European during the seventeenth century.

Pilgrimage to Mecca

During Pitts's time with his last master that he made his journey to Mecca to complete the hajj. Having converted to Islam under his second master, Ibrahim, Pitts departed for the hajj with his third master around 1685. His account described many aspects of the Islamic pilgrimage including the hajj caravans, the rites at Mecca, and the customary visit to Medina.

Initial rites

As a pilgrim, Pitts participated in the initial rites upon arriving in Mecca. This time is filled with the pilgrims' first tawaf, cleansing and drinking at the Zamzam Well, and completion of the sa'i. Today the sa'i is completed within the mosque in Mecca called Masjid al-Haram. During Pitts's time, and up until the 1950s, this was completed on the street.

Mount Arafat 
In chapter 7, Pitts says that they leave Mecca to visit “a certain hill called Gibbel el orphat (or el-Arafat), i.e., the Mountain of Knowledge.” Here he witnesses the pilgrims perform wuquf at Arafat. It is the “how, when, and where [pilgrims] receive this honorable title of hajji for which they are at all this pains and expense," Pitts states. He describes the times that the pilgrims perform their preparations for the prayers and rites to be completed while at the hill, and how "they [beg] earnestly for the remission of their sins and [promise] newness of life using a form of penitential expressions and thus continuing for the space of four or five hours."

Sexuality, women, and slavery in Pitts's narrative 

Pitts does not often mention women in his writings and it appears there were very few opportunities for him to be around women. Pitts encounters violence against women several times in his account, most notably when describing the Imperial Turkish camps where he wrote that the soldiers are "apt to drink, and are abominably rude, insomuch that it is very dangerous for any woman to walk in any by-place but more dangerous for boys, for they are extremely given to sodomy…" 

In his discussion of marriage, Pitts describes how the marriage agreement takes place between the groom and the father of the bride. The woman's possible feelings or misgiving about the union are not mentioned at all. Pitts appears to perceive women as having little to no power in their relationships with men. He also discusses the idea of divorce and of Muslim men having multiple wives. According to Pitts, divorce is fairly common in the Islamic world and both parties are free to remarry afterwards. Multiple wives are not as common though; Pitts reports that very few men have multiple wives except out in the rural areas. Pitts touches on female power, but only from his perspective of interactions with the elite, and his background from England.

Pitts details a visit to a slave market in Cairo while he is on the hajj with one of his masters. In the market place, Pitts observes the selling of women and men. While men are forced to act out tricks to show off their strength and abilities like a horse show, the women are treated in a different manner. Women would be dressed in fine clothing when being exposed in markets, in hopes of catching a buyer's eye. Pitts says that while the women's faces were veiled, men were allowed to freely view their faces, to feel the inside of their mouths and teeth, and to caress their breasts. If a woman's virginity was questioned, slave traders would sometimes permit a potential buyer to escort the she-slave into a private tent, allowing the customer to discover the answer to the question themselves. He notes that many of the slaves are women and children as the men are kept as rowing slaves aboard ships. He also describes many of the people as "Muscovites and Russians, and from those parts and some of the emperor of Germany's parts". These slaves have lighter skin, and they are dressed in fine clothing so they will fetch a higher price at auction.  The slaves are examined much like animals; buyers are allowed to checked their teeth, muscles, and stature to get an idea of the overall health of a slave.

Relationship with masters

Pitts served a total of three masters, with varying degrees of treatment. While little insight is given into Pitts's first master, his second master, Ibrahim, treated him very poorly. At the beginning of Pitts' capture, he mentions the poor diet that he and the other slaves were fed. When planning a mutinous revolt, Pitts describes how the rebellion was discovered: the suspect of the uprising was brought forward in front of his fellow captives. Pitts states: ‘The captain, with a great rope, gave him about an hundred blows on his buttocks, but he would not confess the fact, generously choosing rather to suffer himself than to bring us all under the bastinadoes also’. Many slaves watched as other slaves were beaten and tortured.

Pitts’ narrative then turns to forced conversions to Islam. He states: ‘It hath been affirmed by some that the slaves that are sold in this country are never compelled to turn to the Mohammetan religion.’ Even after changing religions, Ibrahim treated Pitts just as maliciously as he had before, beating Pitts until he bleed.

Pitts describes his third and final as master treating him like a son, seeing as he had no children or relatives and after given freedom, he continued to stay with him. From an Islamic context, freeing a slave was looked at as a great act of piety, and the act could allow the slave master to be forgiven of his sins. When Pitts made the decision to leave, escaping back to his native homeland, he became conflicted as to whether or not he should leave his fatherlike master who had made promises of leaving all of his belongings to Pitts after his death.

Controversy

Conversion 

At the time period in which Pitts's narrative was written, many other writers of slave narratives were claiming, like Pitts, to have been forced  into converting to Islam. Researchers have suggested that some claims were false, that North Africa was religiously more tolerant at this time. Christian captives who converted before returning to their native lands lied about having converted because the English Christians—their own families included—would have persecuted them. Researchers describe the way, in English theatre at this time, renegades were often considered to be on par with Satan-worshipers and atheists, and traitors to their countries.

However other scholars do not question the idea of forced conversion, like author Robert Davis who in his article Christian Slaves, Muslim Masters White Slavery in the Mediterranean, the Barbary Coast, and Italy, 1500-1800 details the abuse that European slaves suffered. He explains that if a slave is an embarrassment to his master, his master in return will punish him greatly, “beat a disappointing slave until the man was crippled or even killed. At least a dead slave could be quietly disposed of, without causing his master further embarrassment.”  While Pitts does degrade Islam in part of his narrative, other times he claims that Christianity could learn from the devotion that Islam has.

The relationship between religion and power is complicated. Freedom of religious practices in the Ottoman Empire were tolerated.  “Tolerance is based on a state of inequality in which the most powerful party (such as the ruler) decides whether a less powerful group can exist or not and to what extent members of that group are allowed to manifest their difference”   In A True and Faithful Account of the Religion and Manners of the Mohammetans Pitts expresses his relationship to Islam throughout his narrative.  From the very beginning Pitts is hypercritical of Islam, but also subtly and not so subtly criticizes Christianity.  The subtle and not so subtle criticism over both religions opens the reader to question Pitts true relationship to both religions.  Pitts conversion to Islam happened early in his enslavement. Because he was forced to convert to Islam, he did not have the chance to fully assess what it meant to be a Muslim.

Physical abuse 

There is controversy within the academic community as to the veracity of the abuse that Pitts, and many of his fellow captives, received at the hands of their masters.  Many scholars cast doubt on Pitts's account.  Claire Norton posits various reasons why beating a slave as a form of proselytization would have been illogical. A slave beaten into conversion would be of no economical value as Muslims were socially pressured to free their slaves once they converted.  The Barbary Coast was also very egalitarian in its religious diversity, Christian services being held in various places, decreasing the likelihood that a Christian would have no place in Islamic society.

Other scholars, such as Robert Davis, also doubt the validity of many slave narratives while allowing that the use of violence against one slave served “as a warning to all the other slaves who might witness or hear of it to be on their best behavior.” Pitts himself discredits the forced conversion trope, stating that this was a rare occurrence, “though it was my hard fortune to be so unmercifully dealt with.” However, Pitts provides a reason why his masters would have used violent force against him, namely that one of his masters had a sordid past and hoped to unburden his sins by forcing Pitts to convert and then freeing him, a holy rite within Islam.

References

External links 
Travel, Trade and the Expansion of Empire

Pilgrims from Islamic lands, The British Museum

Slavery in Algeria
Islam and slavery
1663 births
1735 deaths
18th-century English writers
18th-century English male writers
Islamic studies
People who wrote slave narratives
17th-century slaves
Slaves from the Ottoman Empire
18th-century memoirists